Fushun (formerly romanised as Fouchouen, using French spelling, also as Fuxi) is a prefecture level city in Liaoning province, China, about  east of Shenyang, with a total area of ,  of which is the city proper. Situated on the Hun River ("muddy river"), it is one of the industrial and economic development hubs in Liaoning.

History

The Ming dynasty first constructed Fushun walled city in 1384 after the division of the Yuan dynasty. "Fushun" is an abbreviation of the Chinese saying "", which literally means "to pacify the frontiers; to guide the Yi foreigners".

The Jurchen (Manchu) leader Nurhaci married his granddaughter by his son Abatai to the Ming dynasty General Li Yongfang after Li surrendered Fushun in 1618 and defected to the Qing. One of Li Yongfang's descendants was sentenced to death by the Qianlong emperor, but his life was spared when he helped suppress the Lin Shuangwen rebellion.

Fushun was in ruins in the one-and-a-half centuries of early Qing dynasty. In 1783, the new walled city was completed southwest of the old city. In 1908, Fushun became the seat of Xingren County (later renamed to Fushun County). Fushun was occupied by Russia until 1905 and by Japan until 1945. With the Japanese victory over Imperial Russia and signing of the Treaty of Portsmouth, the South Manchuria branch (from Changchun to Lüshun) of the China Far East Railway was transferred to Japanese control. South Manchuria Railway Company quickly expanded the system inherited from Russia to staggering proportions. Coal mines were developed at Fushun. Under the control of the Japanese and with 30 years of development, Fushun area became highly industrialized. Fushun gained city status in 1937.

Population
As of the 2020 census, Fushun has a total population of 1,854,372 people, whom 8,192,848 lived in the built-up (or metro) area encompassing 8 out of 10 Shenyang urban districts (all but Shenbei Xin and Liaozhong not being conurbated yet) and the 4 Fushun urban districts. This makes Shenyang-Fushun the 8th most populous built up area in China after the Pearl River Delta conurbation of Guangzhou, Shenzhen, Dongguan, Foshan, Jiangmen, Zhongshan and Huizhou, then Shanghai-Suzhou, Beijing, Tianjin, Hangzhou-Shaoxing, Wuhan and Nanjing.

Administrative divisions

Fushun consists of 4 districts, 1 county and 2 autonomous counties.

Climate

Economy

Fushun is a highly industrialized area and nicknamed "the City of Coal". It has developed as a thriving center for fuel, power and raw materials and is also offering more and more opportunities in textiles and electronics. One of the world's largest open-pit coal mines, the West Open Mine, is located south of the city. Exploited from the 12th century, it was operated as an open pit mine during the 20th and early 21st Century; however, as of 2015, the West Open pit, 1,000 feet deep, with an area of 4.2 square miles, was exhausted and unstable. Total coal production in Fushun as a whole had fallen below 3 million tons, down from 18.3 million tons in 1962. Fushun has a major aluminum-reduction plant and factories producing automobiles, machinery, chemicals, cement, and rubber.

The total GDP of the city of Fushun was 54.27 billion yuan in 2009 (ranked 4th out of the 58 cities and counties in Liaoning province). The GDP per capita of the city of Fushun was 40391 yuan in 2009. (ranked 21st out of all 58 cities and counties in Liaoning province).

Resources

Fushun is rich in wood, coal, oil shale, iron, copper, magnesium, gold, marble, titanium, and marl resources.

Fushun is known as "the capital of coal". The main coal and oil shale company is Fushun Mining Group, which produced about 6 million tons of coal in 2001, mainly blending coking coal and steam coal. The company also has coalbed methane resources of around 8.9 billion cubic meters. In addition, it owns geological reserves of high grade oil shale, about 3.5 billion tons, of which the exploitable reserve is 920 million tons.

Industrial development
Hydroelectric and thermal power are important locally available energy sources.

Fushun has developed through the utilization of the abundant natural mineral deposits found in the area and is a nationally important heavy industrial base for petroleum, chemical, metallurgy machinery and construction material industries. New sectors also becoming prominent are electronics, light industry, weaving and spinning.

In 1928, the commercial-scale production of shale oil began in Fushun with the construction of Fushun Coal Mine Temporary Oil Plant of South Manchurian Railway, aka the Western Refinery, operating Fushun-type retorts. After World War II, shale oil production ceased, but 100 Fushun-type oil shale retorts and the related shale oil processing units were restored in 1949. In 1950, a total of 266 retorts were in operation, each with a capacity of 100–200 tonnes of shale oil per day. In 1954, "Refinery No. 2" began production and in 1959 maximum annual shale oil production increased to 780,000 tonnes.

From 1965 oil shale usage in Fushun started to decline with the discovery of Da Qing oil field in the 1960s. Sinopec, a shale oil producer during those times, shut down its oil shale operations in the beginning of the 1990s. At the same time, the Fushun Oil Shale Retorting Plant was established as a part of the Fushun Mining Group. It started production in 1992. In the same year, the China National Oil Shale Association was established in Fushun.

At the end of 2006, the Fushun Mining Group operated the largest shale oil plant in the world, consisting of seven retorting units with 20 retorts in each unit, for a total 140 sets of Fushun type retorts.

There are also two oil refineries. Fushun Petrochemical Company, a subsidiary of PetroChina, is building a refining and petrochemical complex in Fushun.

Transportation
Railways and highways connect the city to Shenyang and Jilin Province.

Education

The highest-ranked institution of higher education is the Liaoning University of Petroleum and Chemical Technology, ranked 123rd in China overall. Fushun No.1 High School and Fushun No.2 High School are major high schools in Fushun.

The 44 middle school is located in the second street, Xin Fu District. Location is close to FuShun's CBD. Transport is very convenient.  All students come from this community. Because of the population's decline in current years there are not many students compared to 10 years ago. There were over 1000 students in the 1990S, while now around 200 students.
Although the number of students has dropped, the quality of education, the advanced learning facilities and modern school are still evident. 
There are indoors gymnasium, big dance and musical instrument rooms. The play yard is all about synthetic surface track. 
The 44 middle school is actually changed in term of their learning and teaching's facilities, equipment and school's building. 
It represents new outlooks regarding middle-level education in a third-line city in China.

Tourism

Fushun has high mountains and thick woods. It includes the  Dahuofang Reservoir, the largest man-made lake in northeast China.

There are a number of historic and cultural sites. Fushun's success in applying for two UNESCO World Heritage sites is expected to attract more tourists. They include a site known as Xingjing City, the origin of the Qing Dynasty, which is within today's Fushun. It was the first capital of the Late Jin dynasty, dating to 1616. The second site contains the Yongling tombs, where several members of the royal household are buried.

In more recent times, Fushun was where Lei Feng was stationed as a soldier and died, and a memorial museum telling his life story is a popular attraction. It is located at Wang Hua District in Fushun. It was also in Fushun that the last emperor, Puyi, was imprisoned after the end of World War II. The Fushun War Criminals Management Centre is converted into a museum in 1986. Another war memorial, the Pingdingshan Tragedy Memorial Hall Ruins, tells the story of a massacre of Chinese people by the Japanese in 1931. It was rebuilt and expanded in 2007. It includes a pit filled with about 800 bodies—largely infants, adults, and the elderly who were killed by the Japanese.

The Ring of Life monument opened in 2013 and features an observation deck overseeing the city. This circular tower, 515-foot (approximately 157 meters) tall, cost over $15 million to build. It is covered with 12,000 LED lights.

In addition, Red River Valley in Fushun has opened a number of summer resorts. Tourists can travel down the river on small rubber rafts through mountain scenery; the valley is called 'the first rafting route in northern China'. Fushun Pingdingshan Massacre Memorial Hall. This is a memorial to a large massacre that occurred in Fushun.

Sports
The city used to be home of the Chinese Super League (soccer) team of Liaoning FC at Leifeng Stadium. However, when the team could not afford the rent at the Leifeng Stadium it moved to Beijing, where it now plays out of Chaolai Soccer Base in the northeastern part of that city.

Notable figures
 Nurhaci, the first Manchu ruler, was born in today's Xinbin Manchu Autonomous County. 
 Lei Feng, who was a soldier enshrined in new China history after 1949, died in this city. There is a memorial park named after him in Fushun's Wanghua District.
 Li Xianglan, also known as Yoshiko Otaka, Yoshiko Yamaguchi, or Shirley Yamaguchi, was a famous Fushun-born ethnic Japanese singer and movie star in China during the 1930s and 1940s.
 Wang Nan, famous table-tennis sportswoman, who has won many gold medals around the world.
 Puyi, the last Emperor of China, spent ten years in a Fushun War Criminals Management Centre.

The film The Lover starring Tony Leung Ka Fai described a love story between a young French woman and a young man from Fouchouen.

Sister cities

International 

  Lipa City, Batangas, Philippines

References

External links
 Fushun official website
 Liaoning Business Guide: Fushun

 
Cities in Liaoning
Prefecture-level divisions of Liaoning